

County Board of Commissioners

Muskingum County, Ohio, is governed by a three-member county commission. As of November 2015, the board has one Democratic member, Jerry Lavy, and one Republican member, Jim Porter. The third seat is currently vacant.

County Prosecutor

County Auditor

Clerk of Courts

Sheriff

The following is a list of all Sheriff's to hold the position in Muskingum County since 1804.

 – coroner and acting Sheriff
 – died in office

Recorder

Treasurer
The first county treasurer was William Montgomery

Engineer

Coroner
The first county coroner was Levi Whipple.

Common Pleas Court Judges

County Court Judges

References 

Muskingum County, Ohio